The Faroe Islands national football team represents the Faroe Islands in association football and is controlled by the Faroe Islands Football Association (FSF), the governing body of the sport in the country. It competes as a member of the Union of European Football Associations (UEFA), which encompasses the countries of Europe. Organised football has been played in the country since the 19th century; Tvøroyrar Bóltfelag was its first club, founded in 1892. Initially, clubs played friendlies to determine the winner of an unofficial championship, with matches being contested home and away, depending on the weather and the state of the generally uneven grass pitches. The Faroe Islands Sports Association was formed in 1939, and three years later a national league was created. Cup competitions were introduced in 1955 before the FSF was founded on 13 January 1979.

The Faroe Islands joined the International Federation of Association Football (FIFA) on 2 July 1988, and played its first official match—a 1–0 defeat against Iceland—on 24 August 1988. The nation recorded its first victory in its next friendly, 1–0 against Canada. On 18 April 1990, the Faroe Islands became a member of UEFA and entered its first major international competition later that year: the qualifying rounds for the 1992 UEFA European Football Championship. The team won their first competitive match on 12 September 1990 when they defeated Austria 1–0. The Faroe Islands made its first appearance in the qualifying rounds of the FIFA World Cup during the 1994 edition, but the country has yet to reach the finals of either competition.

The team's largest victory came on 7 June 2021 when they defeated Liechtenstein by five goals to one. Their worst loss is 8–1 against Yugoslavia in 1996. The Faroe Islands have also been defeated by seven goals to nil three times: against Yugoslavia in 1991; Romania in 1992; and Norway in 1993. Fróði Benjaminsen holds the appearance record for the Faroe Islands, having been capped 87 times during an international career that lasted 16 years. The goalscoring record is held by Rógvi Jacobsen, who scored ten times in 54 matches. As of January 2020, the Faroe Islands are ranked 110th in the FIFA World Rankings. Its highest ever ranking of 74th was achieved in July 2015.

Results 
Key

H = Home ground
A = Away ground
N = Neutral ground
(X) = Goals scored

(OG) = Own goal

Friendly

UEFA Euro 1992 qualifying

1994 FIFA World Cup qualifying

UEFA Euro 1996 qualifying

1998 FIFA World Cup qualifying

UEFA Euro 2000 qualifying

2000–01 Nordic Championship

2002 FIFA World Cup qualifying

UEFA Euro 2004 qualifying

2006 FIFA World Cup qualifying

UEFA Euro 2008 qualifying

2010 FIFA World Cup qualifying

UEFA Euro 2012 qualifying

2014 FIFA World Cup qualifying

UEFA Euro 2016 qualifying

2018 FIFA World Cup qualifying

2018–19 UEFA Nations League

UEFA Euro 2020 qualifying

All-time record 
Key

P = Matches played
W = Matches won
D = Matches drawn
L = Matches lost

GF = Goals for
GA = Goals against
Countries are listed in alphabetical order

References

External links 

Faroe Islands at FIFA
Faroe Islands at UEFA

Faroe Islands national football team
Faroe Islands
Football